Emboonops is a genus of spiders in the family Oonopidae. It was first described in 2015 by Bolzern, Platnick & Berniker. , it contains 10 species, all from Mexico.

Species
Emboonops comprises the following species:
Emboonops arriaga Bolzern, Platnick & Berniker, 2015
Emboonops bonampak Bolzern, Platnick & Berniker, 2015
Emboonops calco Bolzern, Platnick & Berniker, 2015
Emboonops catrin Bolzern, Platnick & Berniker, 2015
Emboonops hermosa Bolzern, Platnick & Berniker, 2015
Emboonops mckenziei (Gertsch, 1977)
Emboonops nejapa Bolzern, Platnick & Berniker, 2015
Emboonops palenque Bolzern, Platnick & Berniker, 2015
Emboonops tamaz Bolzern, Platnick & Berniker, 2015
Emboonops tuxtlas Bolzern, Platnick & Berniker, 2015

References

Oonopidae
Araneomorphae genera
Spiders of Mexico